Cantonists (Russian language: кантонисты; more properly: военные кантонисты, "military cantonists") were underage sons of conscripts in the Russian Empire. From 1721 on they were educated in special "cantonist schools" (Кантонистские школы) for future military service (the schools were called garrison schools in the 18th century). The cantonist schools and the cantonist system were eventually abolished in 1857, following public and international criticism and the Russian defeat in the Crimean War.

Cantonist schools during the 18th and early 19th centuries 
Cantonist schools were established by the 1721 decree of Tsar Peter the Great that stipulated that every regiment was required to maintain a school for 50 boys. Their enrollment was increased in 1732, and the term was set from the age of 7 to 15. The curriculum included grammar and arithmetic, and those with a corresponding aptitude were taught artillery, fortification, music and singing, scrivenery, equine veterinary science, or mechanics. Those lacking such talents were taught carpentry, blacksmithing, shoemaking and other trades useful to the military. The most able were taught for additional 3 years, until the age of 18. All entered military service at the completion of their studies. The decree of 1758 required all male children of the military personnel to be taught in the cantonist schools. In 1798 a military "asylum-orphanage" was established in St Petersburg, and all regimental schools were renamed after it, the total enrollment reaching 16,400.

The schools were reorganized in 1805 and all children were now referred to as cantonists. After the War of 1812 their number increased dramatically, when many orphaned children of military personnel killed in the war enrolled in cantonist schools voluntarily. During this period the curriculum of cantonist schools was equivalent to that of gymnasia, and military subjects were not taught.

In 1824 all cantonist schools were made answerable to the Director of Military Settlements Count Aleksey Arakcheyev, and in 1826 they were organized into cantonist battalions. The standards of curriculum dropped significantly, and it was limited to the subjects useful to the military.

During the reign of Nicholas I of Russia the number of cantonists reached 36,000. Several cantonist battalions became specialized: they prepared auditors, artillerists, engineers, military surgeons, cartographers.

More children were added to the category of cantonists. Eventually children of the discharged soldiers were also included, illegitimate children of soldiers' partners or widows, and even foundlings.

There were several exemptions:
Legitimate sons of staff-officers, and all officers awarded the Order of St. Vladimir 4th class.
A single son of a junior staff-officer, out of a total number of his children, if he had no sons born after his attainment of the officer's rank.
A single son of a junior officer maimed in battle.
A single son of a widow of a junior officer or an enlisted man killed in action or deceased during service.

There were considerable differences in cantonists' service obligations:
 Children of nobility were required to serve for 3 years at the completion of their studies.
 Children of senior officers - 6 years.
 Children of clergy - 8 years.
 All other social categories - 25 years.

Cantonism and ethnic minorities 
There was forcible conscription of underage recruits from the populations of indigenous peoples, Old Believers, Gypsies, and common vagabonds from 1805, Jews from 1827, and Poles from 1831.

There were some significant differences in treatment of Jews and non-Jews: all others were required to provide conscripts between 18 and 35, while for Jews the age limit was 12–25, and it was left to the discretion of the Jewish qahal to choose conscripts from whatever age they decided. Thus in practice, Jewish children were often conscripted as young as eight or nine years old. This system created a disproportionate number of Jewish cantonists, and betrayed the utilitarian agenda of the statute: to draft those more likely to be susceptible to external influence, and thus to assimilation.

Jews 
After 1827, the term was applied to Jewish and Karaite boys, who were drafted to military service at the age of twelve and placed for their six-year military education in cantonist schools. Like all other conscripts, they were required to serve in the Imperial Russian army for 25 years after the completion of their studies (in 1834 the term was reduced to 20 years plus five years in reserve and in 1855 to 12 years plus three years of reserve). According to the "Statute on Conscription Duty" signed by Tsar Nicholas I of Russia on August 26 (September 7 new style), 1827, Jews were made liable to personal military service and were subject to the same conscription quota as all other tax-paying estates ("sosloviya") in the Russian Empire. The total number of conscripts was uniform for all populations (four conscripts per each thousand subjects); however, the actual recruitment was implemented by the local qahals and so a disproportionate number of Jewish conscripts were underage.

In the aftermath of the Polish uprising of 1831, children of political prisoners and boys on the streets of captured cities often were abducted, and placed in cantonist schools, with the intent of their Russification, see Incorporation of Polish children into the Imperial Russian Army (1831-1832) for more.

The vast majority of Jews entered the Russian Empire with the territories acquired as the result of the last partitions of Poland of the 1790s; their civil rights were severely restricted (see Pale of Settlement). Most lacked knowledge of the official Russian language. Before 1827, Jews were doubly taxed en lieu of being obligated to serve in the army  and their inclusion was supposed to alleviate this burden. However, the number of recruits reduced the number of young men that could go into the workforce, and this in combination with political restrictions led to widespread destitution.

Russia was divided into northern, southern, eastern, and western "conscription zones" and the levy was announced annually for only one of them. The Pale of Jewish settlement was outside conscription in the fallow years, so the conscription in general and of cantonists in particular occurred once every four years, except during the Crimean War, when conscription was annual. The first 1827 draft involved some 1,800 Jewish conscripts; by the qahal's decision half of them were children. In 1843 the conscription system was extended to the Kingdom of Poland that was previously exempt from it.

Strains within the Jewish community 
The 'decree of August 26, 1827' made Jews liable for military service, and allowed their conscription between the ages of twelve and twenty-five. Each year, the Jewish community had to supply four recruits per thousand of the population. Strict quotas were imposed on all communities and the qahals were given the unpleasant task of implementing conscription within the Jewish communities. Since the merchant-guild members, agricultural colonists, factory mechanics, clergy, and all Jews with secondary education were exempt, and the wealthy bribed their way out of having their children conscripted, fewer potential conscripts were available; the adopted policy deeply sharpened internal Jewish social tensions. Seeking to protect the socio-economic and religious integrity of Jewish society, the qahals did their best to include “non-useful Jews” in the draft lists so that the heads of tax-paying middle-class families were predominantly exempt from conscription, whereas single Jews, as well as "heretics" (Haskalah-influenced individuals), paupers, outcasts, and orphaned children were drafted. They used their power to suppress protests and intimidate potential informers who sought to expose the arbitrariness of the qahal to the Russian government. In some cases, communal elders had the most threatening informers murdered (such as the Ushitsa case, 1836), see mesirah.

The zoning rule was suspended during the Crimean war, when conscription became annual. During this period the qahals leaders would employ informers and kidnappers (Russian: "ловчики", lovchiki, khappers), as many potential conscripts preferred to run away rather than voluntarily submit. In the case of unfulfilled quotas, younger boys of eight and even younger were frequently taken.

Training and pressures to convert 

All cantonists were institutionally underfed, and encouraged to steal food from the local population, in emulation of the Spartan character building. On one occasion in 1856, a Jewish cantonist, Khodulevich, managed to steal the Tsar's own watch during military games at Uman. Not only was he not punished, but he was given a reward of 25 roubles for his prowess.

The boys in cantonist schools were given extensive training in Russian grammar (and sometimes literature), and mathematics, in particular geometry necessary in naval and artillery service. Those who showed aptitude for music were trained in singing and instrumental music, as the Imperial Army had a large demand for military wind bands and choirs. Some cavalry regiments maintained equestrian bands of torban players, and cantonist schools supplied these as well. Some cantonist schools also prepared firearms mechanics, veterinarians for cavalry, and administrators ("auditors").

The official policy was to encourage their conversion to the state religion of Orthodox Christianity and Jewish boys were coerced to baptism. As kosher food was unavailable, they were faced with the necessity of abandoning of Jewish dietary laws. Polish Catholic boys were subject to similar pressure to convert and assimilate as the Russian Empire was hostile to Catholicism and Polish nationalism. Initially conversions were few, but after the escalation of missionary activities in the cantonist schools in 1844, about one third of all Jewish cantonists would have undergone conversion.

Other 
In the era of Arakcheev's military settlements (1809-1831), indigenous peasants who fell within the territory of a military settlement were subject to incorporation into the military in various ways. In particular, indigenous children (under the age of 18) were considered military cantonists and divided into three age groups: minor (under the age of 7), middle (ages 8–12), and senior, with the latter group assigned to the military school of the settlement. Minors stayed with the parents, while minor orphans were transferred to military settlers, with an award of 10 roubles. All male newborns automatically became cantonists. Later it turned out that instead of 11 years,
8 years of military training were enough. Correspondingly, the age groups were changed: under 10, under 14, and under 18.

In the aftermath of the Polish uprising of 1831, children of political prisoners and boys on the streets of captured cities were often abducted, and placed in cantonist schools for Russification: see Incorporation of Polish children into the Imperial Russian Army (1831-1832) for more.

In the army 
For all cantonists, their 25-year term of service began after they reached the age of 18 and were recruited into the army.

Discriminatory regulations ensured that unconverted Jews were held back in their army promotions. According to Benjamin Nathans,
"... the formal incorporation of Jews into Nicolas I's army was quickly compromised by laws distinguishing Jewish from non-Jewish soldiers. Less than two years after the 1827 decree on conscription, Jews were barred from certain elite units, and beginning in 1832 they were subject to separate, more stringent criteria for promotion, which required that they "distinguish themselves in combat with the enemy."

Jews who refused to convert were barred from ascending above the rank of "унтер-офицер" i.e. NCO; only eight exceptions were recorded during the 19th century. These restrictions were not lifted until the February Revolution in 1917.

Some baptized cantonists eventually reached high ranks in the Imperial Army and Navy; among them were generals Arnoldi, Zeil; admirals Kaufman, Sapsay, Kefali.

Literary references 
The cantonists' fate was sometimes described by Yiddish and Russian literature classics.

Alexander Herzen in his My Past and Thoughts described his somber encounter with Jewish cantonists. While being convoyed to his exile in 1835 at Vyatka, Herzen met a unit of emaciated Jewish cantonists, some eight years old, who were marched to Kazan. Their (sympathetic) officer complained that a third had already died.

Nikolai Leskov described underage Jewish cantonists in his 1863 story "The Musk-Ox" (Ovtsebyk).

Judah Steinberg described underage Jewish cantonists in his novel "In Those Days" (English translation in 1915, from the Hebrew).

The agony of Polish children incorporated into the Imperial Russian Army was presented in Juliusz Słowacki's narrative poem Anhelli.

Abolition and results of cantonist policy 
The cantonist policy was abolished by Tsar Alexander II's decree on 26 August 1856, in the aftermath of the Russian defeat in the Crimean War, which made evident the dire necessity for the modernisation of the Russian military forces. Nonetheless, the drafting of children lasted through 1859. All unconverted cantonists and recruits under the age of 20 were returned to their families. The underage converted cantonists were given to their godparents. However the implementation of the abolition took nearly 3 years.

It is estimated that between 30,000 and 70,000 Jewish boys served as cantonists, their numbers were disproportionately high in relation to the total number of cantonists. Jewish boys comprised about 20% of cantonists at the schools in Riga and Vitebsk, and as much as 50% at Kazan and Kiev schools. A general estimate for the years 1840–1850 seems to have been about 15%. In general Jews comprised a disproportionate number of recruits (ten for every thousand of the male population as opposed to seven out of every thousand), the number was tripled during the Crimean War (1853–1856).

At the conclusion of the conscription term, former cantonists were allowed to live and own land anywhere in the Empire, outside the Pale of Settlement. The earliest Jewish communities in Finland were Jewish cantonists who had completed their service. The rate of conversion was generally high, at about one third, as was eventual intermarriage. Most never returned to their homes.

Statistics 
Jewish cantonist recruits in 1843–1854, according to statistics of the Russian War Ministry. Only in the eleven years listed below – the total of 29,115 children were conscripted. Basing on these data, it was estimated that between 1827 and 1856, there were over 50,000 of them.
 1843 - 1,490
 1844 - 1,428
 1845 - 1,476
 1846 - 1,332
 1847 - 1,527
 1848 - 2,265
 1849 - 2,612
 1850 - 2,445
 1851 - 3,674
 1852 - 3,351
 1854 - 3,611

See also 
 1917 film: "The Cantonists" (Кантонисты), historical drama, by director and screenwriter Alexander Arkatov

Military training of children 
 Devşirme system
 Janissary
 Garrison school
 Suvorov Military School
 Nakhimov Naval School

Extra burdens on the Jews 
 Abstinence (conscription)
 Jizya - tax
 Leibzoll - tax
 More Judaico
 Tallage

References

Bibliography 
 2008 YIVO encyclopedia http://www.yivoinstitute.org/downloads/Military_Service.pdf
 Simon Dubnow, The Newest History of the Jewish People, 1789-1914 Vol. 2 (Russian ed. ) pp. 141–149, 306-308
 CANTONISTS, by Herman Rosenthal at Jewish Encyclopedia, 1901–1906
 Benjamin Nathans, Beyond the Pale: The Jewish encounter with late imperial Russia (University of California Press, Berkeley, CA. 2002). pp. 26–38
 
 Larry Domnitch, The Cantonists: The Jewish Children's Army of the Tsar (Devora Publishing, 2004).

External links
 Lecture on the story The Cantonists:
 Life in the Pale of Settlement. Cantonists (Beyond the Pale exhibition)
 Military conscription in 19th century Russia by Dan Leeson (JewishGen)
 The Cantonists (Jewish History on the Web)
  Кантонистские школы
  Кантонисты
  Былое и думы. Часть вторая (Alexander Herzen, My Past and Thoughts, Part Two)
  Э. Шкурко. Еврейские мальчики в солдатских шинелях, или «жизнь за царя». (E. Shkurko. Jewish Boys in the Army Overcoats, or "Life for the Tsar")
  В. В. Энгель. Курс лекций по истории евреев в России, тема 6: «Политика самодержавия в отношении евреев во второй четверти XIX века». (V.V.Engel. Lectures on the history of Jews in Russia. Part 6: Tsarist Politics Concerning the Jews in the Second Quarter of the 19th century)
  Феликс Кандель Очерки времен и событий. Очерк седьмой (Felix Kandel. Jewish history. Essay 7) (chassidus.ru)

Jewish Finnish history
Jews and Judaism in the Russian Empire
Military of the Russian Empire
Jewish military history
Society of the Russian Empire
Antisemitism in the Russian Empire
Children in the military
Conscription in Russia